Leidesdorf may refer to:

 Maximilian Leidesdorf (18161889), Austrian psychiatrist
 Maximilian Joseph Leidesdorf (17871840), Austrian pianist, composer and musical publisher
 Samuel David Leidesdorf (18811968), American accountant